New York's 20th State Assembly district is one of the 150 districts in the New York State Assembly. It has been represented by Republican Eric Brown since 2022. He succeeded Melissa Miller, who was appointed to the Hempstead Town Board.

Geography
District 20 is located in Nassau, comprising the neighborhoods of North Woodmere, Inwood, Lawrence, Cedarhurst, Woodmere, Hewlett, Hewlett Bay Park, Hewlett Harbor, Hewlett Neck, Island Park, Long Beach, Lido Beach and Atlantic Beach.

Recent election results

2022

2022 special

2020

2018

2016

2014

2012

2010

References

External links
Map of district

20
Nassau County, New York